Anthony Brown (born 8 March 1961) is a Dutch astronomer currently working at the University of Leiden most noted for leading the Gaia project's Data Processing and Analysis Consortium. He was listed in the 2018 Nature's 10 as one of the Ten people who mattered this year by the scientific journal Nature.

Biography 
Anthony Brown obtained his Master of Science degree cum laude in Astronomy from the University of Leiden in 1991, where he also obtained his PhD in 1996 on the topic of the stellar content and evolution of OB associations. After postdoc positions at the University of Leiden, the National Astronomical Observatory (Mexico), and the European Southern Observatory (Germany), he rejoined the University of Leiden first as a research associate from 2001 to 2006, and then as faculty member.

His involvement with the Gaia mission started in 1997 with contributions to the science case for the mission. As a member of the photometric and classification working groups he contributed to the optimization of the photometric filter system, and has been a member of the Gaia science team since 2006. He was appointed Chair of the Gaia Data Processing and Analysis Consortium (DPAC) Executive in 2012, and is the corresponding author of Gaia Data Release 1 and 2.

He delivered the prestigious Spitzer Lectures at Princeton University in 2019.

Selected papers
 Brown, Anthony GA, et al. "Gaia Data Release 1-Summary of the astrometric, photometric, and survey properties." Astronomy & Astrophysics 595 (2016): A2.

References

Living people
21st-century Dutch astronomers
Leiden University alumni
Year of birth missing (living people)
Academic staff of Leiden University